The 2017–18 UMBC Retrievers women's basketball team represents the University of Maryland, Baltimore County during the 2017–18 NCAA Division I women's basketball season. The Retrievers, led by sixteenth year head coach Phil Stern and members of the America East Conference, began the season playing home games in the Retriever Activities Center before the opening of the new UMBC Event Center on February 3, 2018. The women's first game in the new arena was on February 8 against Binghamton.

Media
All non-televised home games and conference road games will stream on either ESPN3 or AmericaEast.tv. Most road games will stream on the opponents website. Select games will be broadcast on the radio on WQLL-1370 AM.

Roster

Schedule

|-
!colspan=9 style="background:#; color:white;"| Non-conference regular season

|-
!colspan=9 style="background:#; color:white;"| America East regular season

|-
!colspan=9 style="background:#; color:white;"| America East Women's Tournament

See also
2017–18 UMBC Retrievers men's basketball team

References

UMBC
UMBC Retrievers women's basketball seasons
UMBC
UMBC